A mile road system is a system of naming roads by their mile distance from a baseline. Implementations include:

Mile Road System (Michigan), used throughout the state of Michigan
The roads and freeways in metropolitan Detroit include a large mile road system
Mile Road System (Cincinnati), with the mouth of the Little Miami River as the baseline

See also
Street or road name
Street or road name#Grid-based naming systems